Ludmyla Padalko (Ukrainian: Падалко Людмила Іванівна; born 8 March 1949) is a Ukrainian doctor, obstetrician-gynecologist, and chief doctor at the Dnipropetrovsk Regional Perinatal Centre (since 1990), Honoured Doctor of Ukraine (2001), and Candidate of Medicine (2002).

Biography 

Lyudmila was born on 8 March 1949 in Tersyanka, Novomykolaivka Raion, Zaporizhia Oblast. Her father, Ivan Kyi, was a mathematics teacher at a local school. Her mother, Galina, was the head of a grocery store. In 1964–1965, Lyudmila moved to the district centre with her parents and sister, Nina. She met Vadim, her future husband, at the new school. Thanks to the attitudes and perseverance of her father as a teacher, Lyudmila graduated from Novonikolayevsk Secondary School with a gold medal in 1966. She loved biology and chemistry and dreamed of becoming a doctor. After graduation, she worked in the central regional library to prepare for the entrance exams to the university.

In 1967, she entered Voroshilovgrad Medical Institute in the school of medicine. She kept correspondence and telephone conversations with Vadim. She came home each summer and spent time with her future husband, who studied at Dnipropetrovsk Medical Institute. In 1970, they decided to marry, and a year later, Lyudmila transferred to Dnipropetrovsk. In 1971, her son, Gennady, was born. In 1972, Vadim graduated from the university and went to work in the direction of Sinelnik. In 1973, Lyudmila also graduated from the medical institute, receiving the specialty of "general medicine" and the qualification of obstetrician-gynecologist.

After medical school, she completed an internship at Dnipropetrovsk City Hospital No.9, after which she immediately started working at Synelnykove Central Regional Hospital as an obstetrician-gynecologist, where her husband had already worked for a year as a therapist. Later, she received the position of deputy chief physician for the medical domain. During her time as deputy chief physician, she oversaw the liquidation of maternity hospitals at former collective farms, the opening of a regional female consultation, and the development of blood donation.  

After moving to Dnipropetrovsk, Vadim began working at the Dnipropetrovsk Medical Institute as an assistant at the Department of Internal Diseases. In 1985, Lyudmila got a job as an obstetrician-gynecologist at Dnipropetrovsk Regional Oncologic Dispensary. On 10 April 1990, she became the Chief Physician of Dnipropetrovsk City Maternity Hospital No.2. On June 26, 2012, the hospital was reorganized into the Dnipropetrovsk Regional Perinatal Center, where she remains Chief Physician (as of 1 July 2019).

Political activity 

In 1982, Lyudmila was first elected as a deputy in Synelnykove City Council. In 2002, she was elected a deputy in Dnipropetrovsk Oblast Council and was a candidate for people's deputies from the political party "Women for the Future".

In 2005, she joined All-Ukrainian Union "Fatherland", and in 2006, she was the second elected deputy to the Dnipropetrovsk Oblast Council. She worked on the standing committee of the regional council on the issues of entrepreneurship, the processing industry, trade, and consumer services. In 2010, Lyudmila Ivanovna became a deputy to the regional council for the third time. In 2014, in the parliamentary elections, Lyudmila Padalko was on the № 158 election list of the All-Ukrainian Union "Fatherland".

Family 
In 1971, Lyudmila had a son, Gennady. In 1994, her husband, Vadim, died of a severe illness. A year later, her son graduated from Dnipropetrovsk Medical Institute, following in his parent's footsteps. In 2000, he graduated from Yaroslav Mudryi National Law University, and in 2002 from Institute State Administration of the National Academy for Public Administration under the President of Ukraine, having obtained the qualification of a lawyer and a state manager.

Lyudmila Ivanovna also has a daughter-in-law, Natalya, and two grandchildren – Vadim and Lyudmila — named after their grandfather and grandmother.

In the position of Chief Doctor 

During Lyudmila's tenure as a chief doctor, first at the maternity hospital and later at the Dnepropetrovsk regional perinatal centre, she accepted 5843 children (3006 boys and 2837 girls). She oversaw the full scope of obstetric, gynecological, and oncologic surgical interventions, performed more than 4,000 gynecological operations and took over 30,000 women for personal examination.

As a leader, Pdalko carried out activities to improve the material and technical base. With her assistance, a hyperbaric oxygen department was opened in 1991, and the laundry was restored. An anaesthesiology and intensive care department were opened in 1993. In 1998, the centre for women with disabilities was opened. In 2000, the centre for pediatric and adolescent gynecology and the centre for juvenile obstetrics was opened. In 2005, the hospital was certified and received the highest category. In 2006, the breastfeeding support centre was opened. In 2015, an organisational and methodological department with a telemedicine cabinet was opened.

In 1989, at the maternity hospital, the Department of Obstetrics, Gynaecology, and Perinatology of the Faculty of Postgraduate Education Dnipropetrovsk State Medical Academy was opened on the initiative of professor Dubossarska Zinaida. Lyudmila continued setting up the department's work, opened with the support of the rector Novitska-Usenko Lyudmila, where employees conduct medical advisory work for women and newborns in the form of clinical rounds, consultations, surgeries, and consultations

Scientific activities 
During her career, Lyudmila authored several scientific papers:
 Беременность, роды и состояние фетоплацентарной системы у женщин, перенесших кесарево сечение // Збірник наукових праць Асоціації акушерів-гінекологів України. — Сімферополь, 1998. — С. 106—108.
 Досвід реабілітації генеративної функції хворих із запаленням додатків матки // Актуальні проблеми післядипломної освіти. — Кривий Ріг, 1998. — С.41.
 Анализ акушерских кровотечений и опыт лечебной тактики по материалам клинического родильного дома № 2 г. Днепропетровска // Збірник наукових праць Асоціації акушерів-гінекологів України. — Київ: «ТНК». — 1999. — С. 56–57.
 Оцінка ефективності та проблеми акушерської допомоги юним та літнім першовагітнім // Педіатрія, акушерство та гінекологія. — 1999. — № 2. — С. 83–86.
 Особливості перебігу вагітності та пологів у юних першородящих при урогенітальному хламідіозі // Педіатрія, акушерство та гінекологія. – 1999. № 2, С.90–92.
 Клинико-фармакологические аспекты применения препарата "Тержинан" для лечения бактериального вагиноза и кольпитов // Медицина сегодня и завтра. – Харьков. – 2000. – № 2. – С. 101—103.
 Психовегетотативные предикторы позднего гестоза у юних первородящих // Збірник наукових праць асоціації акушерів-гінекологів України. – Київ, 2000. – С. 235—237.
 Автореферат дисертації на здобуття наукового ступеня кандидата медичних наук "Особливості перебігу вагітності, пологів, післяпологового періоду і перинатальні наслідки у юних і вікових першородящих". Київ. – Київська медична академія післядипломної освіти ім. П. Л. Шупіка – 2001 р.
 Стан гормональних, психовегетативних реакцій, сучасна діагностична та лікувальна тактика у юних та вікових першородящих // Медичні перспективи. – Дніпропетровськ, 2001. – Том VІ. – № 3. – С. 61–64.
 Гипербарическая оксигенация в комплексной терапии внутриутробной инфекции // Біль, знеболення, інтенсивна терапія. – 2001. – С. 95–97.
 Роль оперативного родоразрешения в улучшении перинатальных исходов // Збірник наукових праць Асоціації акушерів-гінекологів України. – Київ, 2004. – С. 143—146.
 Репродуктивное здоровье женщины после комплексного лечения генитального эндометриоза // Збірник наукових праць Асоціації акушерів-гінекологів України. – Київ, 2010. – С. 543—548.
 Опыт органосохраняющего лечения прогрессирующей шеечной беременности // Жіночій лікар. – 2011. – № 1 (33). – С. 12–16.
 Проблема спайкообразования в гинекологической практике // Збірник наукових праць Асоціації акушерів-гінекологів України. – Київ, 2012. – С. 167—169.

Awards and Honours 

Lyudmila has been awarded many awards at different levels:

Medals 
 1999 — a commemorative medal "For the Faithful Service to the Hometown";
 2004 — the medal "For Merits to the City";
 2009 — a medal Order of Princess Olga III degree;
 2019 — a commemorative medal "For Services to the City"

Other awards 

 In April 2004, the Honorary Diploma Verkhovna Rada – for a significant contribution to the development of state policy in the field of health, long-term conscientious work, high professionalism, and individuality in work;
 In October 2005, the Certificate of Honour Ministry of Healthcare;
 In June 2007, thanks to the October District Council of Dnipropetrovsk;
 In 2008, the Ministry of Health Care Certificate of Ukraine – for many years of fruitful work, high professionalism, a significant personal contribution to the organisation of the provision of medical care to women and newborns;
 In November 2008, the sign "Honour" of the Ministry of Agrarian Policy of Ukraine;
 In 2009, the honorary title of the chairman of the Dnipropetrovs'k Regional Council and the distinguished name of the chairman of the Dnipropetrovsk Regional State Administration "For the development of the region";
 In September 2010, an honorary diploma from the Dnipropetrovsk regional organisation of the trade union of health workers of Ukraine;
 In August 2015, the diploma and badge of the Verkhovna Rada of Ukraine.

On August 21, 2001, Lyudmila Ivanovna was awarded the honorary title "Honoured Doctor of Ukraine," and on May 15, 2002, she received a Ph.D. in medical sciences in specialty obstetrics and gynecology.

References

Resources 
 In who-is-who.ua 
 In perinatalcenter-dnepr.com 
 In s-meridian.com 
 Падалко Людмила Іванівна // Талановиті співвітчизниці: історико-біографічні нариси: монографія / Л. П. Шумрикова-Карагодіна; дар. Л. П. Шумрикова-Карагодіна. – Дніпропетровськ: Гамалія, 2003. – С.120: фото. –

External links 
 Перинатальному центру 5 лет 
 В Днепропетровске 12-летняя жертва изнасилования родила здорового ребенка 
 Журнал «ЗДОРОВ'Я ЖІНКИ» WH № 05 2016 та стаття «Затримка народження другого і третього плодів при багатоплідній вагітності трійнею (Клінічний випадок)» 
 У Дніпропетровському обласному Перинатальному центрі вітали дітей 
 Преждевременно родившиеся дети: об этом должна знать будущая мама 
 Небайдужість і чуйність зберігають мир 
 Кто станет новым почетным гражданином Днепропетровска? 
 Полкило — не приговор: в Днепре выхаживают крох с критически маленьким весом 
 В Днепропетровске мужчина обвиняет врачей в гибели жены и нерожденной дочки 
 Людмила Падалко: Вершина всех достоинств и успеха 
 Потрійна радість 
 «Народження любить тишу. Тож нам потрібен Мир!» Людмила Падалко

Videos 
 Documentary about the Perinatal Center 
 KZ “DSPC with the DSC stationary”: on the road to European standards of medical services 

People from Zaporizhzhia Oblast
Living people
1949 births
20th-century Ukrainian physicians
Ukrainian obstetricians and gynaecologists
Ukrainian women physicians
Ukrainian women
Soviet obstetricians and gynaecologists
Soviet women physicians